Charles Hendrie (born 5 July 1886, date of death unknown) was an Australian cricketer. He played one first-class cricket match for Victoria in 1912.

See also
 List of Victoria first-class cricketers

References

External links
 

1886 births
Year of death missing
Australian cricketers
Victoria cricketers
Cricketers from Melbourne